David Ujmajuridze (born 17 January 1970) is a retired Georgian football striker. After becoming top goalscorer of the Erovnuli Liga in 1996–97 he tried his luck in Cyprus.

References

External links
 Footballfacts.ru Profile

1970 births
Living people
People from Kobuleti
Footballers from Georgia (country)
FC Dinamo Batumi players
Enosis Neon Paralimni FC players
Cypriot First Division players
Association football forwards
Expatriate footballers from Georgia (country)
Expatriate footballers in Cyprus
Expatriate sportspeople from Georgia (country) in Cyprus